The 2013–14 network television schedule for the five major Brazilian Portuguese commercial broadcast networks in Brazil covers primetime hours from March 2013 to February 2014.

The schedule is followed by a list per network of returning series, new series or telenovelas (soap operas), and series canceled after the 2012–13 season.

Band was the first to announce its schedule on October 16, 2012, followed by Record on March 26, 2013, then Globo on March 27, 2013 with the television special Vem aí and SBT, on March 30, 2013.

Legend
 Light blue indicates Local Programming.

 Gray indicates Encore Programming.

 Light green indicates live sporting events.

 Red indicates series being burned off and other irregularly scheduled programs, including specials.

 Light yellow indicates the current schedule.

Schedule
 From June 15–30, 2013 part of Globo prime time programming will be preempted in favor of coverage of the 2013 Confederations Cup (something also applied to TV Bandeirantes).

Sunday

Monday

Tuesday

Wednesday

Thursday

Friday

Saturday

By network

Band

Returning series:
 CQC
 Pânico na Band
 A Liga
 Mulheres Ricas
 Polícia 24h
 Quem Fica em Pé?

New series:
 Quem Quer Casar com Meu Filho?
 Quem Quer Ser Milionário?

Not returning from 2012-13:

Globo

Returning series:
 A Grande Família
 The Voice Brasil
 Tapas & Beijos
 Louco por Elas
 Profissão Repórter
 Pé na Cova
 Amor & Sexo
 Big Brother Brasil
Telenovelas
 Lado a Lado
 Guerra dos Sexos
 Salve Jorge

New series:
 O Dentista Mascarado
 A Teia
 Doce de Mãe
 A Mulher do Prefeito
 O Caçador
 A Segunda Dama
 Amores Roubados
 Os Experientes
 Assombrações
Telenovelas
 Flor do Caribe
 Sangue Bom
 Amor à Vida
 Saramandaia
 Joia Rara
 Além do Horizonte
 Em Família

Not returning from 2012-13:
 Casseta & Planeta

Record

Returning series:
 A Fazenda
 Legendários
 O Aprendiz
Telenovelas
 Balacobaco

New series:
 José do Egito
 Got Talent Brasil
 A Bíblia
Telenovelas
 Dona Xepa
 Pecado Mortal

Not returning from 2012-13:
 Ídolos
 Fazenda de Verão

SBT

Returning series:
 Amigos da Onça Astros
 A Praça é Nossa
 Esquadrão da Moda
 Supernanny
Telenovelas
 CarrosselNew series:Telenovelas
 ChiquititasNot returning from 2012-13:'''
 Cante se Puder''

References

Television in Brazil
2013 in Brazilian television
2014 in Brazilian television
Brazilian television schedules